The women's 100 metres hurdles event at the 2004 African Championships in Athletics was held in Brazzaville, Republic of the Congo on July 18.

Results
Wind: -0.7 m/s

References
Results

2004 African Championships in Athletics
Sprint hurdles at the African Championships in Athletics
2004 in women's athletics